Chung Sye-kyun (born 5 November 1950) is a South Korean politician who has served as Speaker of the National Assembly from 2016 to 2018 and Prime Minister of South Korea from 2020 to 2021.

He was previously leader of the main opposition Democratic Party between 2008 and 2010, and twice chairman of its predecessor, the Uri Party, first on an interim basis from October 2005 to January 2006 and then fully from February 2007 until the Uri Party's dissolution in August of that year.

On 9 June 2016, he was elected to a two-year term as the Speaker of the National Assembly. Upon becoming the Speaker, following the law that the Speaker cannot be a member of a party, he left the Democratic Party. His membership of the party was restored automatically when his term as Speaker expired on 29 May 2018.

Early life and education
As an undergraduate he studied law at Korea University, and became chairman of the student union there, graduating in 1974. He was nominated as an alternate for a U.S. Asia-Pacific student leadership project in that year. He received a master's degree from the Wagner School of Public Service at New York University in 1983, an MBA from Pepperdine University in 1993, and a doctorate from Kyung Hee University in 2000.

Political career
Chung entered the National Assembly in the 1996 parliamentary election as a member of the main liberal opposition National Congress for New Politics, representing his home county of Jinan, North Jeolla, in the Jinan–Muju–Jangsu constituency.

President Roh Moo-hyun appointed Chung the Minister of Commerce, Industry and Energy at the start of 2006. As minister, Chung received U.S. Energy Secretary Samuel W. Bodman in Seoul, and participated in the Five-Party Energy Ministerial held in Beijing on 16 December 2006, promoting energy efficiency and the development of clean energy technologies.

Democratic Party leader (2008–10)
At the Democratic Party national convention on 6 July 2008, Chung was elected leader of the party, defeating Choo Mi-ae, his closest competitor.

In July 2009, Chung went on a six-day hunger strike to protest a series of media laws passed by the ruling Grand National Party. He resigned his assembly seat on 24 July alongside Chun Jung-bae, labeling the bills invalid and stating that passing legislation through "illegal voting and violence cannot be justified". Some 70 Democratic lawmakers also handed letters of resignation to Chung, and Chung announced that the party would begin a hundred-day campaign in the streets against the laws. Chung and his fellow party members returned to the assembly on 27 August after a month of protests.

Chung faced calls to resign as party leader after the Democratic Party underperformed in the 2010 by-elections, losing five of the eight seats being contested. He accepted the demands and resigned alongside the rest of the party leadership on 2 August taking responsibility for the defeat.

Later legislative career (2010–present)
In the 2012 parliamentary election, Chung moved from Jeolla to Seoul to contest Jongno, an important constituency encompassing the Dongdaemun and the presidential residence at the Blue House. He defeated his Saenuri Party competitor Hong Sa-duk, a six-term assemblyman and leading supporter of Park Geun-hye. Remaining in Jongno as a member of the Minjoo Party of Korea, four years later in the 2016 elections Chung successfully fended off a challenge from another Saenuri heavyweight, former Seoul mayor Oh Se-hoon, confounding opinion polls from before the vote that had suggested Oh would win. Prior to the 2016 election, Chung had criticized the Minjoo leadership for failing to nominate enough women and minority candidates. In December 2019, he was nominated the second prime minister of the Moon Jae-in government. He took office as the 42nd Prime Minister on January 14, 2020.

Trivia
His nickname is the 'Bacteriaman (Baikinman, 세균맨)', so he received a Baikinman doll. Because his name, 세균 (世均, Sye-kyun or Segyun), is pronounced the same as 세균 (細菌, Segyun), which means bacteria.

His religious affiliation is Protestant.

References

External links

|-

|-

|-

|-

Living people
Government ministers of South Korea
Korea University alumni
Kyung Hee University alumni
Members of the National Assembly (South Korea)
Minjoo Party of Korea politicians
Uri Party politicians
New York University alumni
Pepperdine University alumni
Aphae Jeong clan
1950 births
People from North Jeolla Province
Speakers of the National Assembly (South Korea)